Desborough Loatland Ward is a two-member ward within Kettering Borough Council, representing part of Desborough. Prior to 2007 boundary changes, this ward was formerly known as Loatland.

The ward was last fought at Borough Council level in the 2007 local council elections, in which both seats were won by the Conservatives.

The current councillors are Cllr. Mark Dearing and Cllr. June Derbyshire.

Councillors
Kettering Borough Council Elections 2007
Cllr. Mark Dearing (Conservative)
Cllr. June Derbyshire (Conservative)

Kettering Borough Council Elections 2003
Cllr. Belinda Humfrey (Conservative)
Cllr. Mark Dearing (Conservative)

Kettering Borough Council elections 1999
Cllr. Belinda Humfrey (Conservative)
Cllr. Derek Fox (Labour)

Desborough Loatland by-election: 6 November 1997
Unknown Conservative councillor (replacing an unknown Labour councillor)

Current ward boundaries (2007-)

Kettering Borough Council Elections 2007

Former ward boundaries (1999-2007)

Kettering Borough Council elections 2003

(Vote count shown is ward average)

Kettering Borough Council elections 1999
This seat may have been affected by boundary changes at this election.

(Vote count shown is ward average)

Kettering Borough Council by-election: 6 November 1997
Cause: Unknown
Holding Party: Conservative

See also
Kettering
Kettering Borough Council

Electoral wards in Kettering
Desborough